The Watch list of the Rare Breeds Survival Trust is a listing of rare and native United Kingdom breeds of domestic cattle, sheep, pigs, horses, goats and poultry, compiled by the Rare Breeds Survival Trust.

Classification

Mammalian farm breeds are classified into five levels of endangerment, based on the number of breeding females. The five classes are:

Poultry – chickens, ducks, geese and turkeys – are not categorised by degree of numerical rarity; some are classified as "priority breeds".

Listed breeds

Cattle

In 2017, the watch-listed cattle breeds were:

The other native breeds listed were the Aberdeen Angus, Ayrshire, Beef Shorthorn, Belted Galloway, Devon, Galloway, Guernsey, Hereford, Highland, Jersey, Lincoln Red, Longhorn, Luing, Red Poll, Shorthorn, South Devon, Sussex and Welsh Black. The Irish Kerry breed was also considered part of the agricultural heritage of the United Kingdom.

Sheep

Sheep breeds listed in 2017 were:

The other native breeds listed were the Badger Face Welsh Mountain, Beulah Speckled Face, Black Welsh Mountain, Scottish Blackface, Bluefaced Leicester, Brecknock Hill Cheviot, Clun Forest, Dalesbred, Exmoor Horn, Hampshire Down, Hebridean, Herdwick, Jacob, Kerry Hill, Llandovery Whiteface Hill, Lleyn, Lonk, North Country Cheviot, Romney, Rough Fell, Ryeland, Shetland, Shropshire, Southdown, South Country Cheviot, South Wales Mountain, Suffolk, Swaledale, Welsh Hill Speckled, Welsh Mountain and Wiltshire Horn. The Irish Galway breed was also listed.

Pigs

The pig breeds listed in 2017 were:

Goats
In 2017 the Bagot was listed as "endangered" and the Golden Guernsey as "minority".

Horses and ponies

The listed horse breeds in 2017 were:

The other native breeds listed were the Shetland and the Welsh Pony and Cob, and the Irish Draught and Connemara breeds of Ireland were also included.

Poultry

References 

Rare breed conservation